Luxury Problem is a studio album by the American punk rock band Lunachicks. It was released by Go-Kart Records on June 8, 1999. It is the band's most recent album.

Production
The album was recorded after the departure of guitarist Sindi Benezra, making the band a quartet.

Critical reception
Ox-Fanzine called Luxury Problems "a noisy, in no way overproduced punk rock album with a certain 'indie rock' touch ... a solid, satisfying proposition." CMJ New Music Report wrote that the band retains "its fatal chops and sharp lyrical teeth."

Track listing

References

External links
 Lunachicks on Myspace

1999 albums
Lunachicks albums
Go-Kart Records albums